West Timor is an area covering the western part of the island of Timor, except for the district of Oecussi-Ambeno (an East Timorese exclave). Administratively, West Timor is part of East Nusa Tenggara Province, Indonesia. The capital as well as its main port is Kupang. During the colonial period, the area was named Dutch Timor and was a centre of Dutch loyalists during the Indonesian National Revolution (1945–1949). From 1949 to 1975 it was named Indonesian Timor.

The main languages of West Timor, Dawan, Marae and Tetun, as well as several other languages, such as Kemak, Bunak and Helong, are also used in East Timor. The other three languages which are only used in the local area of the Austronesian language group from the Fabron branches are Ndao, Rote and Sabu.

West Timor was a refugee shelter from 1998 to 2002, due to the prolonged East Timor conflict. Some of the most populous cities are Kupang City with over 400,000 inhabitants, Atambua Town with over 86,000 inhabitants, Kefamenanu Town with over 40,000 inhabitants, and Soe City with over 40,000 inhabitants.

History

European colonization of Timor began in the 16th century. Although the Portuguese claimed the island of Timor in 1520, the Dutch (in the form of the Dutch East India Company) settled West Timor in 1640, forcing the Portuguese out to East Timor. The subsequent collapse of the company meant that in 1799, the area returned to official Dutch rule. Finally, in 1914, the border between East and West Timor was finalized by a treaty between Portugal and the Netherlands that was originally signed in 1859 and modified in 1893.

West Timor had the status of residentie within the Dutch East Indies.

Japan conquered the island during World War II in early 1942. Upon Indonesian independence, West Timor became part of the new Republic of Indonesia.

On 6 September 2000, Pero Simundza from Croatia, Carlos Caceres-Collazio from Puerto Rico and Samson Aregahegn from Ethiopia – all UNHCR staff members – were killed in an attack by 5,000 members of a pro-Indonesian militia, armed with machetes, on the office of UNHCR in the town of Atambua, which is in the vicinity of the border with East Timor and where the main refugee camp was located (see attacks on humanitarian workers).

Geography
West Timor is a non-political region that comprises the western half of Timor island with the exception of Oecusse district (which is politically part of East Timor) and forms a part of the Indonesian province of East Nusa Tenggara.

West Timor has large and wide-ranging savannas, and has fairly dry air temperatures, with minimal rainfall.

Rote Island, the southernmost island of Indonesia, is southwest of West Timor.

West Timor's largest town and chief port is Kupang, the capital of Nusa Tenggara Timur province.

West Timor lies between Australia and East Timor which makes the island a strategic place for Indonesian trade.

Administration
West Timor is part of the East Nusa Tenggara province. It was formerly split into the City of Kupang (a kabupaten or regency-level administrative area) and four regencies (kabupaten); from west to east these are: City of Kupang, Kupang, Timor Tengah Selatan (South Central Timor), Timor Tengah Utara (North Central Timor) and Belu. However, a fifth regency – Malaka – was in 2012 formed from the southern half of Belu Regency. Note the administrative area has shrunk as Rote Ndao Regency (Rote and Ndao islands to the southwest) and Sabu Raijua Regency (the Savu Islands further west) were split off in 2002 and 2009 respectively from Kupang Regency.  The island accounts for 35.5% of the provincial population.

Population 
There were approximately 2,011,735 inhabitants in mid 2020, some of them refugees who had fled the 1999 violence in East Timor.

Languages 
In addition to the national language, Indonesian, native languages belonging to the Fabronic Stock of the Austronesian group of languages are spoken in West Timor, the others in East Timor. These languages include Uab Meto, Tetum, Ndaonese, Rotinese and Helong.
 
Knowledge of Dutch (the colonial language) is now limited to the older generations.

Religion 
Similar to East Timor, Christianity is the religion of the overwhelming majority (89%) of the people of West Timor, 53% being Catholic and 36% being Protestant. Islam is followed by 9.7%. The remaining 0.2% includes Hindus and Buddhists. From the Catholic missionary Apostolic Vicariate of Dutch Timor stem the Metropolitan Archdiocese of Kupang and its suffragan Diocese of Atambua.

Economy
West Timor has an average unemployment rate of 2.39%. 30% of the population lived below the poverty line in 1998; as of 2012, it remained at 30%. The economy is mainly agricultural, using slash-and-burn methods to produce corn, rice, coffee, copra and fruit. Some timber harvesting is undertaken, producing eucalyptus, sandalwood, teak, bamboo and rosewood.

References

Further reading

External links
West Timor overview

 

Islands of Indonesia
Landforms of East Nusa Tenggara
History of Timor